Neocorus diversipennis is a species of beetle in the family Cerambycidae. It was described by Belon in 1903.

References

Neocorini
Beetles described in 1903